Nguyễn Văn Tố (5 June 1889 in Hà Đông, French Indochina – 7 October 1947 in Bắc Kạn, Vietnam) pen name Ứng Hoè, was a Vietnamese literary scholar. He taught at the French Viễn Đông Bác Cổ in Hanoi and promoted literacy in Quốc ngữ Latin script through the Đông Dương tạp chí. He was also chairman of the nationalist hội Trí Tri educational movement. He was first Chairman of the National Assembly of Vietnam, despite not being a Communist Party member.

Nguyễn Văn Tố authored many works under his pen name of Ứng Hoè, but one of his works under his real name was a list of Cham place names that existed or still exist in regions of Central Vietnam were once occupied by people of Champa. Most of these villages no longer exist.

In 1947, he was captured and killed by the French army during Operation Léa.

References

1889 births
1947 deaths
Chairmen of the Standing Committee of the National Assembly (Vietnam)